K. V. Ramakrishna Iyer, better known by his pen name, Malayattoor Ramakrishnan (27 May 1927 – 27 December 1997), was an Indian writer of Malayalam literature, cartoonist, lawyer, judicial magistrate, and Indian Administrative Service (IAS) officer. He was best known for his novels, short stories and biographical sketches and his works include Yanthram, Verukal, Yakshi and Service Story – Ente IAS Dinangal. He received the Kerala Sahitya Akademi Award for Novel in 1967. He was also a recipient of the Vayalar Award in 1979.

Biography 

Malayattoor Ramakrishnan was born on May 27, 1927, at Kalpathi, a village renowned for Kalpathi Ratholsavam, near Palakkad in Malabar district of Madras Presidency of the British India to K.R. Viswanatha Iyer, a government official, and his wife, Janaki Ammal, as one of their six children. The family later settled down in Thottuva, near Cheranallur, near the banks of the Periyar River. His schooling was at various schools in Kerala, traveling with his father whose work carried him to many places in the state and he started his college education at Union Christian College, Aluva where he had the opportunity to study under the known critic, Kuttipuzha Krishna Pillai. It was during this period, he participated in the Indian independence movement for which he was incarcerated for a week. Later, he graduated from the University College Thiruvananthapuram and worked as a tutor at his alma mater, Union Christian College, Aluva, for a while.

Later, Ramakrishnan studied law and earned his degree in law to start practicing as a lawyer but moved to Mumbai to join Free Press Journal as an assistant editor where he worked along T. J. S. George. Later, he returned to Kerala to resume his career as a lawyer; it was during this time he unsuccessfully contested the 1954 elections to the Kerala Legislative Assembly from Perumbavoor assembly constituency. Subsequently, he returned to Mumbai for another stint as the sub editor of Free Press Journal when he started writing short articles in their evening bulletin but the stay in Mumbai was again short as he went back to Kerala. Soon, he passed the Municipal Commissioner's examination but could not get a job due to his leaning towards the leftist ideology. However, he passed the Sub-magistrate's examination with a first rank to join the legal services and while working as a sub magistrate, he passed the civil services examination to join the Indian Administrative Service in 1957. He served in various positions during administrative service career until he resigned from service to concentrate on writing.

Ramakrishnan was married to Krishnaveni, the marriage taking place in 1954. He died on December 27, 1997, at Thiruvananthapuram, at the age of 70, survived by his wife and two children. His wife outlived him for two more years and died in 1999. Jayaram, noted Malayalam film actor, is his nephew.

Legacy 
Besides his administrative career, Ramakrishnan's contributions cover the fields of journalism, literature, cartoons and films. While working as a sub-editor in The Free Press Journal in Mumbai, he was also a contributing cartoonist to Shankar's Weekly. His literary career started with detective fiction when he wrote a crime novel, Raathri. He also translated a few Sherlock Holmes novels as well as Dracula into Malayalam, his was the first Malayalam translation of Bram Stoker's novel.

Malayattoor Ramakrishnan wrote the award winning novel, Verukal (Roots) in 1965, a semi-autobiographical work which tells the story of a family of Tamil speaking Iyers who settled in Kerala. The novel was later translated into English by V. Abdulla and published by Orient Longman. Two years later, he published Ponni (1967), which was based on the lifestyle of Adivasis of Attappady at Malleswaram Hills. In 1981, he resigned from the Indian Administrative Service to concentrate more on writing and it was during the period from 1981 to 1997 that his more famous works, viz. Yakshi, Yanthram, Nettoor Mathom and Amritham Thedi, were written. Aaraam Viral was the last of his novels, which he wrote three years before his death; the work has also been translated into English under the title The Sixth Finger by Prema Jayakumar. He also wrote Service Story – Ente IAS Dinangal, which documents his memoirs of his career as a bureaucrat.

Ramakrishnan entered the film industry in 1968 with Lakshaprabhu, a P. Bhaskaran film, for which he provided the story, screenplay and dialogues. Overall, he wrote the screenplay and dialogues for four more films such as Chayam, Gayathri, Panchami and Kalki and another six films viz. Yakshi, Chembarathi, Ponni, Sharapanjaram, Iyer the Great and Akam were based on his story. He was also the director of the 1982 movie, Odukkam Thudakkam, produced by M. O. Joseph which was based on his own story and he himself wrote the screenplay and dialogues for the film. Two film songs have been written by him, one for his directorial venture, Odukkam Thudakkam and the other for the movie, Kalki.

Awards and honours 
Kerala Sahitya Akademi selected Verukal for their annual award for novels in 1967. He received the Vayalar Award in 1979 for the novel, Yanthram. Malayatoor Ramakrishnan Charitable Trust, an eponymous charitable organization, have instituted two awards, the Malayattoor Painting and Sculpture Award for recognising excellence in fine arts and the Malayattoor Award for honouring literary excellence in Malayalam language. M. V. Devan, the noted painter and sculptor, was one among the many recipients of the Malayattoor Painting and Sculpture Award while Prabha Varma, T. D. Ramakrishnan and Perumbadavam Sreedharan feature among the literary award winners.

Bibliography

Novels

 
 
 
 
 
 
 
 
 
 
 
 Mukthichakram
 
 
 
 
 
 Rathri (Night)
 
 
 Vishabeejam

Short stories

 Aadyatthe Kesu (First Case, 1952)
 Avakashi (Heir, 1956)
 Soochimukhi (One with a Needle-face, 1957)
 Verukalkkoranubandham
 
 
 
 
 
 Arabiyum Ottakavum (The Arab and the Camel)
 
 Naalu Anju (Four Five)
 
 
 
 
 
 
 
 
 Sputnikum Gotti Thomasum
 Sherlock Holmes Kathakal

Others

Translations from other languages 
 Manjamukham (Translation)
 Nadodikkappalil Nalumasam (Translation)

Translations into other languages

Films

Direction 
 Odukkam Thudakkam

Screenplay and dialogues 

 Lakshaprabhu
 Chayam
 Gayathri
 Panchami
 Kalki
 Odukkam Thudakkam

Story 

 Lakshaprabhu
 Chayam
 Gayathri
 Panchami
 Kalki
 Odukkam Thudakkam
 Yakshi
 Chembarathi
 Ponni
 Sarapancharam
 Iyer the Great
 Akam

References

External links 

 
 
 

1927 births
1997 deaths
People from Palakkad district
Writers from Thiruvananthapuram
Indian male novelists
Indian male short story writers
20th-century Indian translators
Indian cartoonists
Indian Administrative Service officers
Malayalam-language writers
Malayalam novelists
Malayalam short story writers
Recipients of the Kerala Sahitya Akademi Award
20th-century Indian novelists
20th-century Indian short story writers
Novelists from Kerala
20th-century Indian male writers
Government Law College, Thiruvananthapuram alumni